Goodnight is an unincorporated community in  Barren County, Kentucky, United States. The community was named in honor of Isaac Goodnight a member of the United States House of Representatives from Kentucky.

References

Unincorporated communities in Barren County, Kentucky
Unincorporated communities in Kentucky